Sesat may refer to one of the following.

Seshat, ancient Egyptian goddess of wisdom
Seshat (project), an international scientific research project
SESAT, a satellite owned by Eutelsat
Sesam Search Application Toolkit, a platform for federated search